Jeffrey A. Thompson is a Republican member of the Indiana House of Representatives, representing the 28th District since 1998. He attempted to amend three different measures in the Indiana House to include a ban on specialty plates for an Indiana Youth Group license plate in 2012. He previously served on the Indiana State Fair Board from 1991 to 1998 and as its president from 1995 to 1998.

References

External links
Representative Jeff Thompson official Indiana State Legislature site
 

Living people
Republican Party members of the Indiana House of Representatives
21st-century American politicians
Year of birth missing (living people)
Purdue University alumni